Mikhaylovka is a rural locality (a village) in Inzersky Selsoviet, Arkhangelsky District, Bashkortostan, Russia. The population was 77 as of 2010. There is 1 street.

Geography 
Mikhaylovka is located 36 km northeast of Arkhangelskoye (the district's administrative centre) by road. Verkhny Frolovsky is the nearest rural locality.

References 

Rural localities in Arkhangelsky District